Abja Parish  was a rural municipality of Estonia, in Viljandi County.

After the municipal elections held on 15 October 2017, Abja Parish was merged with Halliste and Karksi parishes and the town of Mõisaküla to form a new Mulgi Parish.

Settlements
Town
Abja-Paluoja

Villages
Abja-Vanamõisa - Abjaku - Atika - Kamara - Laatre - Lasari - Penuja - Põlde - Räägu - Raamatu - Saate - Sarja - Umbsoo - Veelikse - Veskimäe

Twinnings

  Nummi-Pusula, Finland (2004)

References

External links